Ena Begović (8 July 1960 – 15 August 2000) was a prominent Yugoslav film actress. She is regarded as one of the best and most beautiful actresses in former Yugoslavia.

Early life and career 
Begović was born in Trpanj to Terezija and Nikola Begović. Three years later, in January 1963, her sister Mia, who is also an actress, was born. Her father was originally from the municipality of Trpanj, on the Pelješac peninsula.

Begović began acting early, making her first screen appearance at the age of 18 through a small part in Occupation in 26 Pictures, a 1978 film directed by Lordan Zafranović. She made her breakthrough role in Zafranović's next film, The Fall of Italy (1981), where she played Veronika, the daughter of a wealthy local from the Dalmatian coast who sided with the occupying Italian Fascists. This debut established Begović as one of the sex symbols of 1980s Yugoslav cinema, a status that she later successfully maintained despite appearing in relatively few films as her acting career shifted towards theater. 

In the 1990s, the public focused more of its attention on her personal life than on her acting. In 1996, while driving her car in Zagreb, she was involved in a traffic accident resulting in the death of a motorcyclist.

Death 
On 15 August 2000, in the village of Postira on the island of Brač, a few months after marrying the Croatian businessman Josip Radeljak Dikan, and a month and a half after giving birth to their daughter, Lana, she was involved as a passenger in a traffic accident, a rollover, which claimed her life. She was buried at Mirogoj Cemetery in Zagreb, on 19 August.

Filmography

References

External links

1960 births
2000 deaths
Croatian film actresses
Golden Arena winners
Road incident deaths in Croatia
Burials at Mirogoj Cemetery
Yugoslav actresses